Adolfo Urso (born 12 July 1957 in Padua, Veneto) is an Italian politician and journalist.

Biography
Son of Sicilian parents, after studying in Acireale and Catania, Urso graduated in sociology at the "La Sapienza" University of Rome.

He was journalist for the MSI's newspaper Secolo d'Italia, Deputy Director of the newspaper Roma (1991–92), Editor-in-chief of L'Italia settimanale (1993–94) and Director of the magazine Charta Minuta (since 1994).

Urso was elected Deputy from 1994 to 2008, as member of National Alliance first and then of The People of Freedom. He served as Deputy Minister of Productive Activities with delegation to foreign trade in the second and third Berlusconi government. As Deputy Minister he dealt with the internationalization of companies (Law 56/2005), and presented the Italy-Syria agreement on investment protection for parliamentary ratification (Law 258/2003).

In the fourth Berlusconi government Urso was appointed Undersecretary and subsequently Deputy Minister of Economic Development. After joining Gianfranco Fini's new party, Future and Freedom, on 15 November 2010 Urso, along with other FLI representatives Andrea Ronchi, Roberto Menia and Antonio Buonfiglio, as well as Giuseppe Maria Reina of the MPA, resigned and left the Government due to the refusal by Prime Minister Silvio Berlusconi of resign to form a new government open to the Union of the Centre, as had been requested by Fini.

On 19 April 2011 Urso founded the association FareItalia and on 9 July, together with Andrea Ronchi and Giuseppe Scalia, he definitively left FLI.

In 2015 Urso joined Brothers of Italy, party led by Giorgia Meloni, and in 2018 he was elected senator into its lists.

References

1957 births
Living people
Italian Social Movement politicians
National Alliance (Italy) politicians
The People of Freedom politicians
Future and Freedom politicians
Brothers of Italy politicians
Deputies of Legislature XII of Italy
Deputies of Legislature XIII of Italy
Deputies of Legislature XIV of Italy
Deputies of Legislature XV of Italy
Deputies of Legislature XVI of Italy
Senators of Legislature XVIII of Italy
Politicians from Padua
People of Sicilian descent
Meloni Cabinet
Government ministers of Italy
Italian neo-fascists